Stig Andersson may refer to:

 Stig Andersson (canoeist) (born 1927), Swedish sprint canoer 
 Stig Andersson (cyclist) (1924–2015), Swedish cyclist
 Stig Andersson (ice hockey) (1914–2000), Swedish ice hockey player
 Stig Lennart Andersson (born 1957), Danish landscape architect
 Stig Anderson (1931–1997), manager of the pop group ABBA
 Stig Andersson-Tvilling (1928–1989), Swedish ice hockey player and footballer